Kobe University of Commerce refers to:
, 1929-1944:  one of the predecessors of Kobe University.
, 1948-2004:  one of the predecessors of the University of Hyogo.